Vasiľov is a village and municipality in Námestovo District in the Žilina Region of northern Slovakia.

History
In historical records the village was first mentioned in 1554.

World war II 
In September 1939 citizens of Vasiľov witnessed crossing of German soldiers heading to Poland.

4. April front crossed the village. Early in the morning soviets started bombardment around the village. Later that day soviets soldiers arrived.

Geography
The municipality lies at an altitude of 428 metres and covers an area of 9.147 km². It has a population of about 757 people.

External links
http://www.statistics.sk/mosmis/eng/run.html

Villages and municipalities in Námestovo District